Lampsilis is a genus of freshwater mussels, aquatic bivalve mollusks in the family Unionidae, the river mussels. There are over 100 species in the genus.

Some species, notably Lampsilis ovata (pocketbook mussel) use aggressive mimicry to lure large predatory fish by using their mantle as a lure, ejecting larvae into the mouth of the fish when they strike. The larvae attach to the gills, using the fish's blood as food for several weeks.

Species
 Lampsilis abrupta (pink mucket)
 Lampsilis binominata (lined pocketbook)
 Lampsilis bracteata
 Lampsilis cardium
 Lampsilis cariosa (yellow lampmussel)
 Lampsilis dolabraeformis
 Lampsilis fasciola (wavy-rayed lampmussel)
 Lampsilis floridensis (Florida sandshell)
 Lampsilis fullerkati (Waccamaw fatmucket)
 Lampsilis higginsii (Higgins' eye pearly mussel)
 Lampsilis ornata
 Lampsilis ovata (pocketbook mussel)
 Lampsilis powellii (Arkansas fatmucket)
 Lampsilis radiata (Eastern lampmussel)
 Lampsilis rafinesqueana (Neosho mucket)
 Lampsilis reeveiana
 Lampsilis satura
 Lampsilis siliquoidea (fatmucket clam)
 Lampsilis splendida
 Lampsilis straminea (rough fatmucket)
 Lampsilis streckeri (speckled pocketbook)
 Lampsilis teres (yellow sandshell)
 Lampsilis virescens (Alabama lamp naiad)

Gallery

References

Lampsilis at Biolib
Lampsilis at the Catalogue of Life

External links
 Mussel Uses Fake Fish As Lure - Video of lampsilis perovalis luring a fish.

 
Bivalve genera
Taxonomy articles created by Polbot